The 1979 New York Jets season was the 20th season for the franchise and its tenth in the National Football League. It began with the team trying to improve upon its 8–8 record from 1978 under head coach Walt Michaels. The Jets again finished the season with a record of 8–8.

Matt Robinson started the season at quarterback, but got hurt and Richard Todd took the bulk of the duties at Quarterback as the Jets played .500 football posting an 8–8 record for the second straight season, finishing in third place. With the 1979 season, the Jets became one of only three non-expansion teams to not make the playoffs in the 1970s (the others being the New York Giants and New Orleans Saints).

Offseason

Draft

Personnel

Staff

Roster

Regular season

Schedule

Standings

Week 1: vs. Cleveland Browns 
Matt Robinson was named starting quarterback for the Jets against the Cleveland Browns but hid a thumb injury on his throwing hand from three days before the game, until swelling forced him to acknowledge the injury to an angered Walt Michaels and team president Jim Kensil. The injury was treated and Robinson had the tape taken off late in the game with the Jets leading, but a Brian Sipe drive aided by a roughing the passer call against Mark Gastineau led to a game-tying Don Cockroft field goal; forced to play in overtime, Robinson's thumb swelled again and the result was a sloppy pass that was intercepted and led to the game-winning Cockroft field goal. Michaels seethed, "You work, you plan all week, and then the kid hides an injury from you." He refused to play Robinson the rest of the season.

Week 2: at New England Patriots 
The Jets were crushed 56–3 in a game where Steve Grogan of the Patriots set a club touchdown record that would stand until Tom Brady broke it in 2007.

Week 7: vs. Minnesota Vikings 
In the first Monday Night Football game to be broadcast from the New York City area, the Jets beat the Minnesota Vikings 14-7 in front of a raucous crowd, many of whom showed up intoxicated and began throwing bottles onto the field. One Shea Stadium security worker described the scene as worse than the celebration that ensued after the Mets won the 1969 World Series. In all, more than 30 fans and three security guards were hurt and two people were arrested.

Week 13: at Seattle Seahawks 
Seahawks cornerback Cornell Webster blocked a punt by the Jets' Chuck Ramsey, leading to a Seattle score in a 30–7 Seahawks win. Following the game Michaels called out Ramsey in front of Jets players by snarling, "I can fart farther than you can kick!"

References

External links 
 1979 statistics

New York Jets seasons
New York Jets
New York Jets season
1970s in Queens